The Augustinian Academy on Staten Island, New York, was founded on May 30, 1899, in conjunction with the new Roman Catholic parish of Our Lady of Good Counsel, both by the Augustinian Friars. The academy expanded in 1926 and closed in 1969, adding about 250 priests to the Augustinian order.

History 
The academy's original buildings were first erected for the Visitation Sisters, and were purchased and modified by the Augustinians for educational purposes. The academy was dedicated by Archbishop Sebastiano Martinelli on September 10, 1899, and officially opened on September 13 as "The Catholic High School of Richmond Borough". This was the first Catholic settlement in Tompkinsville, and the first Mass was said in the neighborhood on November 12, 1899, in McRobert's Hall on Arietta Street. Our Lady of Good Counsel occupied the large chapel in the academy building, along with the small chapel of Our Lady of Consolation, erected in 1902 on Saint Paul's Avenue.

The original program of study comprised classical, commercial and grammar courses, and was soon accredited by the University of the State of New York. The valuation of the academy and church property was about $100,000 in 1914, . On May 30, 1909, commemorating the 10th anniversary of the academy's founding, the Ancient Order of Hibernians presented the academy with a handsome 100-foot flagpole and a large American flag.

Among the properties that the academy owned, and founded, was a site in Morrisania, Bronx, on the east side of Andrews Avenue, 200 feet south of Fordham Road. The structure would be a two-story brick school, 54x100 feet, built in 1906 to the design of architect J. O'Connor for $50,000, for the now-closed St. Augustine's School.

The academy began educating boys for the priesthood in 1921. It expanded to a 16-acre site in the Grymes Hill neighborhood in 1926, but finally closed in 1969. The Tompkinsville property became a parochial school. The Grymes Hill property was used as a retreat house until 1983, acquired by Wagner College in 1993, then heavily damaged by fires, and ultimately razed in 2006.

Legacy 
"During its 70 years of existence, Augustinian Academy graduated approximately 1,348 men and added about 250 priests to the Augustinian order." One nationally prominent graduate was Edmund Dobbin from the Class of 1953, who went on to become the longest-serving president of Villanova University.

In 2009, New York City renamed the academy's former location on Grymes Hill as "Augustinian Academy Way". In 2012, Good Counsel Church dedicated its Augustinian Academy Historical Monument, including the bell from the school's demolished tower.

References 

Religious organizations established in 1899
Educational institutions established in 1899
Defunct schools in New York City
Defunct Catholic secondary schools in New York City
1969 disestablishments in New York (state)
1899 establishments in New York City
Roman Catholic high schools in Staten Island
Buildings and structures demolished in 2006
Grymes Hill, Staten Island
Tompkinsville, Staten Island